("Park of the Philosophy Shrine" or "Temple Garden of Philosophy") is a public park in Tokyo, Japan. Most of the park is in Nakano Ward, while approximately 7% (at the south-eastern edge) is in Shinjuku Ward. It was created successively during the years 1904 to 1919 by the philosopher and founder of Toyo University, Inoue Enryō. Inoue thought of this philosophical theme park as a place for mental cultivation. In 2020, the park was designated a National Site of Scenic Beauty.

Outline

The main characteristics of the park are 77 garden features named according to philosophical concepts and the commemoration of various sages and philosophers of the Eastern and the Western philosophical traditions.

Philosophers and Sages

 The Four Sages of World Philosophy: Buddha, Confucius, Socrates, Kant
 The Six Wise Men of the East: Shōtoku Taishi, Sugawara no Michizane, Zhuāngzǐ, Zhū Xī, Nāgārjuna, Kapila
 The Three Founders of Philosophy: The Yellow Emperor, Akṣapāda, Thales
 The Three Japanese Erudites: Hirata Atsutane, Hayashi Razan, Gyōnen

Facilities

Tetsugaku-dō Park has a play area for children, toilets, a Japanese garden and a plum garden.

Gallery

Literature 
Schulzer, Rainer, ed. Guide to the Temple Garden of Philosophy (Toyo University Press, 2019).

See also
 Parks and gardens in Tokyo
 National Parks of Japan

References

External links

 Official website (Japanese)
 Introductory videos (English)

Parks and gardens in Tokyo